Sahil Shroff is an Indian model and actor who made his debut in Hindi film Don 2: The King is Back.

Early life
Sahil comes from a Sindhi family and grew up in Australia. He did his master's degree in information technology, pursued management studies in Australia and worked graveyard shifts as a bouncer in the nightclubs there. He then moved to Mumbai and has been modelling full-time. His enviable physique and ability to carry off clothes got him noticed in the modeling circles.

Career

Sahil is best known as a contestant on the first season of the reality television competition The Amazing Race Asia, from 2006 to 2007. He has also done many TV commercials including HCL Enterprise, Tata Indica, Lux and Cadbury's Eclairs, and walked for designers like Manish Malhotra, Vikram Phadnis, Narendra Kumar and JJ Valaya. He took acting and voice lessons from veterans like Anupam Kher before walking into films.

In 2011, he made his Bollywood debut playing a supporting role in Farhan Akhtar's sequel Don 2. The film stars Shahrukh khan, Priyanka Chopra, Boman Irani and Lara Dutta. Sahil plays a young cop Arjun, who lends a helping hand to co-star Priyanka Chopra in her quest to chase the wily antagonist. The film released on 23 December 2011 and had rocked the box office by grossing  on the opening weekend.

In 2021, he participated in Bigg Boss 15 as a contestant.

Filmography

References

External links
 GS shoot by Tarun Khiwal
 

Indian male models
Living people
Male actors in Hindi cinema
Sindhi people
1982 births
The Amazing Race contestants
Bigg Boss (Hindi TV series) contestants